Dead Moon Rising is a 2007 horror film written and directed by Mark E. Poole.  It stars Jason Crowe, Mike Seely, and Erica Goldsmith as locals who must fight waves of zombies in Louisville, Kentucky.

Plot 
An unexplained phenomenon causes a zombie pandemic.  Jim and Nick, workers at a car rental service in Louisville, Kentucky, attempt to survive the zombie apocalypse.  With the help of April, Dick, Vix, and several other friends and locals that they pick up along the way, the group makes its way through the city.  Eventually, they manage to rally a large number of bikers, who proceed to fight the zombies in a thousand-person brawl.

Cast 
 Jason Crowe as Jim
 Mike Seely as Nick
 Erica Goldsmith as April
 Gary Williams as Dick
 Tucky Williams as Vix

Production 
Poole, who was influenced by Shaun of the Dead and 28 Days Later, shot the film in Louisville, Kentucky.  When The Courier-Journal ran a story about the film, Poole was inundated with locals who volunteered to appear as extras in the film.  The climactic zombie fight was recognized by the Guinness World Records as the largest zombie scene filmed.  Poole also received an offer for free helicopter service.

Release 
The film premiered in Louisville on May 1, 2007.  It was released on DVD on March 4, 2008.

Reception 
Brian McNail of Brutal as Hell wrote, "Dead Moon Rising is by far one of the worst filmed, acted, special effects-enhanced movies I have seen in a LONG time."  Peter Dendle wrote that the film may be meaningful to Louisville residents but will not appeal to anyone else.

Dead Moon Rising was selected as Best Zombie Film at Fright Night Film Fest and Best Feature at Cine-Fest, both in 2007.  Fangoria selected it as its top video rental for May 2008.

References

External links 
 

2007 films
2007 horror films
American zombie films
American independent films
Films set in Kentucky
Films shot in Kentucky
Louisville, Kentucky in fiction
2007 directorial debut films
2000s English-language films
2000s American films